Rhenium trioxide or rhenium(VI) oxide is an inorganic compound with the formula ReO3.  It is a red solid with a metallic lustre that resembles copper in appearance. It is the only stable trioxide of the Group 7 elements (Mn, Tc, Re).

Preparation and structure
Rhenium trioxide can be formed by reducing rhenium(VII) oxide with carbon monoxide at 200 °C or elemental rhenium at 400 °C.

Re2O7  +  CO   →   2 ReO3  +  CO2
3 Re2O7  +  Re   →   7 ReO3

Re2O7 can also be reduced with dioxane.

Rhenium trioxide crystallizes with a primitive cubic unit cell, with a lattice parameter of 3.742 Å (374.2 pm). The structure of ReO3 is similar to that of perovskite (ABO3), without the large A cation at the centre of the unit cell. Each rhenium center is surrounded by an octahedron defined by six oxygen centers. These octahedra share corners to form the 3-dimensional structure.  The coordination number of O is 2, because each oxygen atom has 2 neighbouring Re atoms.

Properties

Physical properties
ReO3 is unusual for an oxide because it exhibits very low resistivity. It behaves like a metal in that its resistivity decreases as its temperature decreases. At 300 K, its resistivity is 100.0 nΩ·m, whereas at 100 K, this decreases to 6.0 nΩ·m, 17 times less than at 300 K.

Chemical properties 
Rhenium trioxide is insoluble in water, as well as dilute acids and bases. In concentrated nitric acid, it yields perrhenic acid.
Upon heating to 400 °C under vacuum, it undergoes disproportionation:
 3 ReO3   →   Re2O7  +   ReO2

Uses

Hydrogenation catalyst
Rhenium trioxide finds some use in organic synthesis as a catalyst for amide reduction.

References

Rhenium compounds
Hydrogenation catalysts
Transition metal oxides